Steinfeld is a municipality in the district of Vechta, in Lower Saxony, Germany. It is situated approximately 16 km southwest of Vechta, and 40 km northeast of Osnabrück.

References

Vechta (district)